The eighth series of British reality television series The Apprentice (UK) was broadcast in the UK on BBC One, from 21 March to 3 June 2012. While only one minor change was made to the format of the first task, the general format of the programme itself remained virtually unchanged for this series. Alongside the standard twelve episodes, two specials were aired alongside this series – "The Final Five" on 29 May, and "Why I Fired Them" on 2 June. Sixteen candidates took part in the eighth series, with Ricky Martin becoming the overall winner. Excluding specials, the series averaged around 7.35 million viewers during its broadcast.

Series overview 
Applications for the eighth series began towards the final episodes of the previous series, with auditions, interviews and assessments made in July 2011. Once the sixteen candidates for the final line-up were selected and notified, production began in Autumn of that year. Prior to the candidates starting their first task, the production staff and Alan Sugar opted for a minor change in the format of the first task, allowing candidates to view and use their accommodation before beginning the process – up until this series, candidates never used, let alone viewed their accommodations, until after the first task and the resulting boardroom scenes. In the first task, the men formed under the team name of Phoenix, while the women formed under the team name of Sterling.

Of those who took part, Ricky Martin would become the eventual winner, and go on to use Sugar's investment to set up a scientific recruitment company, Hyper Recruitment Solutions (HRS), on 23 October 2012. He would later be invited back to help as an interviewer for the tenth series. Nick Holzherr, who would lose out in the final, would later go on to raise £1 million to invest in a new online business, "Whisk", and become a success story with what he learned from their participation in the programme.

Candidates

Performance chart 

Key:
 The candidate won this series of The Apprentice.
 The candidate was the runner-up.
 The candidate won as project manager on his/her team, for this task.
 The candidate lost as project manager on his/her team, for this task.
 The candidate was on the winning team for this task.
 The candidate was on the losing team for this task.
 The candidate was brought to the final boardroom for this task.
 The candidate was fired in this task.
 The candidate lost as project manager for this task and was fired.

Episodes

Ratings 
Official episode viewing figures are from BARB.

Specials

References

External links 

 

2012 British television seasons
08